Domesday refers to the Domesday Book, a survey of the land conquered by the Normans in 1066.

Domesday may also refer to:

Survey
 Exon Domesday, the Domesday of Exeter, England
 Winton Domesday, the Domesday of Winchester, England

BBC works about the Domesday
 BBC Domesday Project, laserdisc publication
 BBC Domesday Reloaded, website

See also 
 Domesday Book (disambiguation)
 Doomsday (disambiguation)
 Doomsday Book (disambiguation)